Husam Azzam is a Palestinian track and field athlete. He was, according to the International Paralympic Committee, "the first Palestinian athlete to compete in Paralympic Games" when he represented Palestine at the 2000 Summer Paralympics in Sydney. Azzam won a bronze medal in Sydney in the shot put, with a throw of 6.94 metres. It was the first Paralympic medal for Palestine.

He represented Palestine again at the 2004 Summer Paralympics in Athens, and won silver in the shot put event.

Competing for the third time at the 2008 Summer Paralympics in Beijing, he was Palestine's flagbearer during the Games' Opening Ceremony.

References 

Living people
Palestinian shot putters
Male shot putters
Paralympic athletes of Palestine
Athletes (track and field) at the 2000 Summer Paralympics
Athletes (track and field) at the 2004 Summer Paralympics
Paralympic silver medalists for Palestine
Paralympic bronze medalists for Palestine
Palestinian male athletes
Medalists at the 2000 Summer Paralympics
Medalists at the 2004 Summer Paralympics
Paralympic medalists in athletics (track and field)
1975 births